Pleshanovo is a rural locality (a village) in Nelazskoye Rural Settlement, Cherepovetsky District, Vologda Oblast, Russia. The population was 3 as of 2002. There are 9 streets.

Geography 
Soyvolovskaya is the nearest rural locality.

References 

Rural localities in Cherepovetsky District